A by-election was held for the Australian House of Representatives seat of Adelaide on 10 January 1914. This was triggered by the death of Labor Party MP Ernest Roberts.

The by-election was won by Labor Party candidate George Edwin Yates. Single Tax League candidate Edward Craigie had previously contested the seat at the 1913 federal election as an independent candidate, achieving 4.6 percent of the vote. Voting was not compulsory in 1914.

Results

See also
 List of Australian federal by-elections

References

1914 elections in Australia
South Australian federal by-elections
1910s in Adelaide